The Gulf 39 is an American sailboat that was designed by Capital Yachts as a cruiser and first built in 1971.

Production
The design was built by Capital Yachts in Harbor City, California, United States, starting in 1971, but it is now out of production.

Design
The Gulf 39 is a recreational keelboat, built predominantly of fiberglass, with wood trim. It has a masthead sloop rig, a raked stem, a reverse transom, a pilot house, a skeg-mounted rudder controlled by a wheel and a fixed fin keel. It displaces .

See also
List of sailing boat types

References

Keelboats
1980s sailboat type designs
Sailing yachts
Sailboat type designs by Capital Yachts
Sailboat types built by Capital Yachts